, formerly  until 2009, is a Japanese manufacturing company that produces  fishing equipment in addition to tennis, golf and biking gears. Globeride's fishing products, sold under the Daiwa brand, account for the majority of its sales, including rods, reels, lines and fishing-related apparels (such as polarized sunglasses). The company also offers licensed Prince brand tennis gear, G-III brand golf gear, Bottecchia bicycles and other outdoor products.

The company operates from offices throughout Japan and internationally from subsidiaries in Australia, France, Germany, Mainland China and Taiwan, Thailand, the United Kingdom and the United States. The British subsidiary, Daiwa Sports Ltd., was established in 1977 and production commenced the following year with the production of fishing rods and golf clubs.

Brands
Globeride has fishing (Edwin, Snow Peak, Daiwa), golf (Fourteen, Roddio, G-III, ONOFF), racket sports (Prince) and cycle sports brands (Bottecchia, Focus Bikes, Corratec) in its portfolio.

See also 

 ABU Garcia
 Comparison of hub gears
 Penn Reels
 Shimano

References

External links
  

Manufacturing companies based in Tokyo
Companies listed on the Tokyo Stock Exchange
Sporting goods manufacturers of Japan
Fishing equipment manufacturers
Golf equipment manufacturers
1958 establishments in Japan
Manufacturing companies established in 1958
Sportswear brands
Japanese brands